The Chase County Courthouse in Cottonwood Falls, Kansas was built in 1873 and is the oldest operating courthouse in Kansas.

Overview
The courthouse was constructed from local limestone, and the three story winding staircase was constructed from local walnut trees. The architectural style has been described as Second Empire or French Renaissance Revival.

The building was listed on the National Register of Historic Places in 1971. The architect was John G. Haskell who was among the architects of the Kansas State Capitol.

Tours are available by appointment by contacting the Chase County Chamber of Commerce.

Gallery

References

External links

Chase County, Kansas - Courthouse tour and history, video 8:30
Treynor Preservation Photographs
Chase County Chamber Tour Information and Photographs

Courthouses on the National Register of Historic Places in Kansas
Buildings and structures in Chase County, Kansas
County courthouses in Kansas
Government buildings completed in 1873
Italian Renaissance Revival architecture in the United States
Italianate architecture in Kansas
Clock towers in Kansas
Tourist attractions in Chase County, Kansas
National Register of Historic Places in Chase County, Kansas